The Santa Clara County Sheriff's Office  is a local law enforcement agency that serves Santa Clara County, California. It provides general-service law enforcement to unincorporated areas of Santa Clara County, as well as incorporated cities within the county that have contracted with the agency for law-enforcement services such as Saratoga, Cupertino, and Los Altos Hills. The Santa Clara Valley Transportation Authority also contracted with the Sheriff's Office for law enforcement service.

History
On December 15, 1998, Laurie Smith became the 28th person to hold the position of sheriff in Santa Clara County, California and the first woman law enforcement officer to hold the office of sheriff in the history of California. In early 2022, Smith retired while under grand jury corruption charges and after a unanimous vote of no confidence by the county Board of Supervisors. She was convicted in November.

On August 27, 2015, mentally-ill inmate Michael Tyree was beaten to death by three jail guards. The guards were convicted of second-degree murder in 2017.

Two inmates escaped from custody in San Jose in November 2016. Two more inmates escaped from custody in Palo Alto in November 2017.

In November 2022, Bob Jonsen was elected to succeed Smith. Jonsen served as Chief of Police for the City of Palo Alto prior to his election.

Organization
The Department is divided into four major bureaus — Field Operations, Support Services, Jail Operations and Administrative Services.

Rank structure
Currently, the Sheriff's Office has 586 full-time sworn staff. These positions are broken down as follows:

In addition to the full-time sworn staff, the Sheriff's Office has 65 Reserve Deputy Sheriffs. To support the entire operation, the Department employs 223 non-sworn, civilian staff.

Fallen officers
Since the establishment of the Santa Clara Sheriff's Office, seven officers have died while on duty.

See also

List of law enforcement agencies in California

References

External links
 www.sccgov.org/sites/sheriff/ — Santa Clara County Sheriff's Office

Sheriffs' departments of California
Law enforcement in the San Francisco Bay Area
Sheriff's Office
Organizations based in Santa Clara County, California
1850 establishments in California